The Clinton LumberKings are a collegiate summer baseball team of the Prospect League. They are located in Clinton, Iowa, and play their home games at NelsonCorp Field. From 1956 to 2020, they were members of Minor League Baseball's Midwest League. With Major League Baseball's reorganization of the minor leagues after the 2020 season, Clinton was not selected to continue in affiliated baseball.

Clinton baseball history
After beginning play in 1895, Clinton had sporadic teams in various leagues over the next few decades, as the Great Depression, World War I and World War II affected many baseball franchises. However, Clinton joined the Midwest League in 1956 and is now the oldest franchise in the league. The team has had several different major league affiliations: the Brooklyn Dodgers (1937–38), New York Giants (1939–41), Chicago Cubs (1947–49),  Pirates (1954–58 and 1966–68), White Sox (1959–65),  Pilots/Brewers (1969–70), Tigers (1971–75), Tigers/White Sox co-op (1976), Dodgers (1977–79), Giants (1980–94), Padres (1995–98), Reds (1999–2000), Expos (2001–02), and Rangers (2003–08), and Mariners (2009–18). In September 2018, they entered into a two-year player development contract with the Miami Marlins.

Aside from its time as the C-Sox (1960–65) and the Pilots (1966–76), the team used the parent major league team's nickname before adopting the LumberKings name for the 1994 season.

The 2010 LumberKings season is the subject of the 2013 book "Class A: Baseball in the Middle of Everywhere" by Lucas Mann.

In 2016, led by first year manager Mitch Canham, the LumberKings won 86 games to set the mark for most in a regular season by any team in Clinton franchise history.  The squad went on to sweep the Peoria Chiefs in the first round of the playoffs before defeating the Cedar Rapids Kernels in a thrilling three-game series.  Game three of the Western Division final ended with a Ricky Eusebio walk off hit to win 1–0 in extra innings.  The LumberKings would fall, however, in the Midwest League Championship in four games to the Great Lakes Loons.

In addition to playing host to the franchise record setting LumberKings (86-54), the LumberKings transformed their ballpark overnight following game two of the Midwest League Championship to become a football field.  The LumberKings played host to Camanche High School Football in the inaugural "LumberBowl."  Camanche hosted Williamsburg High School in the game on September 16, 2016.  The Raiders of Williamsburg defeated the Indians 55–7.

Following the 2020 season, the LumberKings were cut from the Midwest League and affiliated baseball as part of Major League Baseball's reorganization of the minor leagues. They later joined the Prospect League, a collegiate summer baseball league, for 2021.

NelsonCorp Field

The home park for the LumberKings is NelsonCorp Field in Clinton, Iowa. The stadium was built in 1937 as a Works Progress Administration (WPA) project and named Riverview Stadium, due to its location on the banks of the Mississippi River. It was renamed Alliant Energy Field in 2002 and renovated in 2005–2006 to a capacity of 4,000. It was renamed to Ashford University Field in 2011 and NelsonCorp Field in 2019. The Dimensions are: LF – 330, CF – 401, RF – 325.

No-hitters
Clinton has tossed 25 no-hitters. The list includes the following no-hitters:

Playoffs

Roster

Notable alumni

 Kyle Seager (2009)  MLB All-Star
 Mitch Moreland (2008)
 Justin Smoak (2008)
 Blake Beavan (2008)
 Neftalí Feliz (2008):  2010 AL Rookie of the Year
 Derek Holland (2008)
 Craig Gentry (2007)
 John Mayberry, Jr. (2006)
 John Danks (2004)
 Ian Kinsler (2004) 4x MLB All-Star
 Edinson Vólquez (2004) MLB All-Star
 Grady Sizemore (2001) 3x MLB All-Star
 Jason Bay (2001): 2004 NL Rookie of the Year
 Ben Broussard (1999)
 Matt Clement (1996) MLB All-Star
 Gary Matthews, Jr. (1995) MLB All-Star
 Bob Howry (1994)
 Mike Myers (1991–92)
 Salomón Torres (1991)
 Steve Reed (1989)
 Royce Clayton (1989) MLB All-Star
 Rod Beck (1988) 3x MLB All-Star
 Mike Remlinger (1987) MLB All-Star
 Matt Williams (1986) 4x GG; 5x MLB All-Star; 1994 NL Home Run Leader
 Dennis Cook (1985)
 Charlie Hayes (1984)
 John Burkett (1984) 2x MLB All-Star; 1993 NL Wins Leader
 Matt Nokes (1982) MLB All-Star
 Rob Deer (1980)
 Chris Brown (1980) MLB All-Star
 Scott Garrelts (1980) MLB All-Star; 1989 NL ERA Leader
 Orel Hershiser (1979): NLCS MVP (1988), WS MVP (1988), NL Cy Young Award (1988)
 Candy Maldonado (1979)
 Steve Sax (1979) 1982 NL Rookie of the Year
 Mitch Webster (1978–79)
 Ron Kittle (1977):  1983 AL Rookie of the Year
 Mike Scioscia (1977) 2x MLB All-Star; Manager: 2002 World Series Champion – California Angels
 Mickey Hatcher (1977)
 Dave Stewart (1977) MLB All-Star; 1987 AL Wins Leader; 1989 World Series MVP
 Dave Rozema (1975)
 Ron LeFlore (1973) MLB All-Star; 2x AL Stolen Base Leader (1978, 1980)
 Jim Leyland (MGR 1972–73)  Manager: 1997 World Series Champion – Florida Marlins
 Bill Travers (1970) MLB All-Star
 Gorman Thomas (1970) MLB All-Star; 2x AL Home Run Leader (1979,1982)
 Darrell Porter (1970) 4x MLB All-Star; 1982 World Series MVP
 Tom Kelly (1969) Manager: 2x World Series Champion (1987,1991) – Minnesota Twins
 Jim Slaton (1969) MLB All-Star
 Frank Taveras (1968) 1977 NL Stolen Base Leader
 Don Money (1966) 4 x MLB All-Star
 Denny McLain (1962): 2x AL Cy Young Award (1968–1969), AL Most Valuable Player (1968)
 Ken Berry (1961) 2x GG; MLB All-Star
 Tommy McCraw (1960)
 Gerry Arrigo (1960) MLB All-Star
 Al McBean (1958)
 Lou Johnson (1955)
 Dean Stone (1949) MLB All-Star
 Sid Gordon (1939–40), 2x MLB All-Star
 Bing Miller (1914, 1916–17)

References

External links

 

Baseball teams established in 1954
Prospect League teams
Defunct Midwest League teams
Professional baseball teams in Iowa
Cincinnati Reds minor league affiliates
Seattle Mariners minor league affiliates
San Diego Padres minor league affiliates
Texas Rangers minor league affiliates
Los Angeles Dodgers minor league affiliates
San Francisco Giants minor league affiliates
Montreal Expos minor league affiliates
Chicago White Sox minor league affiliates
Detroit Tigers minor league affiliates
Milwaukee Brewers minor league affiliates
Seattle Pilots minor league affiliates
Pittsburgh Pirates minor league affiliates
Miami Marlins minor league affiliates
Clinton, Iowa
Illinois-Indiana-Iowa League teams
Chicago Cubs minor league affiliates
New York Giants minor league affiliates
Brooklyn Dodgers minor league affiliates
Central Association teams
Amateur baseball teams in Iowa
1954 establishments in Iowa